Brendan Aquilina (born 23 September 1987) is a Maltese international lawn and indoor bowler.

Bowls career

Outdoors
He was born in Wollongong, Australia and started bowling at the Jamberoo Bowling Club in New South Wales. He represented Malta in the 2010 Commonwealth Games.

He was selected as part of the Maltese team for the 2018 Commonwealth Games on the Gold Coast in Queensland where he reached the semi finals of the Pairs with Shaun Parnis. In 2019 he won the pairs bronze medal with Mark Malogorski at the Atlantic Bowls Championships and in 2020 he was selected for the 2020 World Outdoor Bowls Championship in Australia.

In 2021, Aquilina won the 2020 triples title with Gary Kelly and Corey Wedlock at the delayed Australian National Bowls Championships. The following day he also won the fours title with Wedlock, Jamie Turner and Aaron Teys.

Indoors
In 2019 he finished runner-up to Gary Kelly in the final of the World Cup Singles.

References

1987 births
Living people
Bowls players at the 2010 Commonwealth Games
Bowls players at the 2018 Commonwealth Games
Commonwealth Games competitors for Malta
Australian people of Maltese descent